North Dakota Highway 48 (ND 48) is a north–south state highway in the U.S. state of North Dakota. The southern segments southern terminus is at ND 25 in Center, and the northern terminus is at ND 200 west of Fort Clark. The northern segments southern terminus is at ND 200 east of Riverdale, and the northern terminus is at U.S. Route 83 (US 83) in Coleharbor.

Major intersections

References

048
Transportation in Oliver County, North Dakota
Transportation in McLean County, North Dakota